The Battle of Hatcher's Run, also known as Dabney's Mill, Armstrong's Mill, Rowanty Creek, and Vaughn Road, fought February 5–7, 1865, was one in a series of Union offensives during the siege of Petersburg, aimed at cutting off Confederate supply traffic on Boydton Plank Road and the Weldon Railroad west of Petersburg, Virginia.

Background
The Union plan was to send Brig. Gen. David McM. Gregg's cavalry out to the Boydton Plank Road to destroy all the Confederate supply wagons they could find, while the V Corps and II Corps provided support and kept the Confederates occupied to the north and east.

Opposing forces

Union

Battle
On February 5, Gregg's cavalry division rode west to Dinwiddie Court House and the Boydton Plank Road via the Malone Road two miles (3 km) south of Ream's Station. The V Corps, under the command of Maj. Gen. Gouverneur K. Warren, moved southwest towards Dinwiddie Courthouse via Rowanty Post Office/Billup's Post Office (Old Stage Road) one mile (1.6 km) north of Ream's Station. The V Corps crossed Rowanty Creek at Monk's Neck Bridge and took up a blocking position on the Vaughn Road between Gravelly and Little Cattail Runs to protect Gregg's right flank and prevent interference with the operations. Two divisions of the II Corps under Maj. Gen. Andrew A. Humphreys moved from the Halifax Road down the Vaughn Road to Hatcher's Run and shifted west to Armstrong's Mill north of the Run to cover Warren’s right flank. Late in the day, Confederate Maj. Gen. John B. Gordon attacked the II Corps from the north and attempted to turn Humphreys's right flank near the mill, but was repulsed. During the night, the II Corps was reinforced by both the V Corps and Gregg's cavalry, which had returned to the Vaughn Road after finding little supply wagon traffic on the Boydton Plank Road. This extended the Union line south of Hatcher's Run.

On February 6, the V Corps lines were attacked by elements of Confederate Brig. Gen. John Pegram's Division. The Confederates were driven back, but a counterattack by Confederate Brig. Gen. Clement A. Evans stopped the Union advance. Later in the day Pegram's and Maj. Gen. William Mahone's divisions attacked the Union center near Dabney's Mill south of Hatcher's Run. The Union line collapsed under the attack, but reformed the north of the mill, parallel to Hatcher's Run. Pegram was killed in the action.

On February 7, Warren launched an offensive and drove back the Confederates, recapturing most of the Union lines around Dabney's Mill that had been lost the day before.

Aftermath
Union troops extended their siegeworks to the Vaughn Road crossing of Hatcher's Run.  The Confederates kept the Boydton Plank Road open, but were forced to extend their thinning lines.

On April 21, 1896, Union assistant surgeon Jacob F. Raub was awarded the Medal of Honor for his actions during the battle.

Battlefield preservation
The Civil War Trust (a division of the American Battlefield Trust) and its partners have acquired and preserved  of the battlefield in four different transactions dating back to 1990.

References

External links
 National Park Service battle summary
 Petersburg National Battlefield battle description
 Civil War Preservation Trust
 CWSAC Report Update
 Confederate Order of Battle for Hatcher's Run (Nigel Lambert) 

Petersburg Campaign
Battles of the Eastern Theater of the American Civil War
Union victories of the American Civil War
Battles of the American Civil War in Virginia
Dinwiddie County in the American Civil War
1865 in the American Civil War
1865 in Virginia
February 1865 events